Statistics of League of Ireland in the 1971/1972 season.

Overview
It was contested by 14 teams, and Waterford won the championship.

Final classification

Results

Top scorers

Ireland, 1971-72
1971–72 in Republic of Ireland association football
League of Ireland seasons